Brown–Ellis House, also known as the Amos Brown House and Baker House, is a historic home located at Highland, Ulster County, New York. The house was originally built about 1800, and expanded and renovated in the Greek Revival style about 1835.  It consists of a -story main block with a wing.  It is of timber-frame construction and has gable roofs on both sections.  A full width Colonial Revival style front porch was added about 1910.

It was listed on the National Register of Historic Places in 2014.

References

Houses on the National Register of Historic Places in New York (state)
Greek Revival houses in New York (state)
Colonial Revival architecture in New York (state)
Houses completed in 1800
Houses in Ulster County, New York
National Register of Historic Places in Ulster County, New York